José de Rocha (15 August 1936 – 7 February 2015) was a Portuguese sprinter. He competed in the men's 100 metres at the 1964 Summer Olympics.

References

External links
 

1936 births
2015 deaths
Athletes (track and field) at the 1964 Summer Olympics
Portuguese male sprinters
Olympic athletes of Portugal
Place of birth missing